Kanchannagar Model School and College is a higher secondary school in Jhenaidah District in south-western Bangladesh.

Established in 1973, it is one of the oldest schools in Jhenidah. As of 2012, there are nearly 1,900 students. Prodip Kumar Biswas is the principal of the school.

Schools rules include regular class attendance, and adherence to a school dress code. Every day there is assembly before the classes. There are three major examinations per year.

Educational institutions established in 1973
High schools in Bangladesh
Schools in Jhenaidah District
1973 establishments in Bangladesh